Beautiful/Decay is an art magazine created by Amir H. Fallah and Jay Littleton. First published as a black-and-white zine at a Kinko's in 1996, it was resurrected as a full-fledged magazine in 2001. In his Basics Illustration series, author and artist Mark Wigan named it an essential magazine resource for "global contexts".

Footnotes

References

External links
 

1995 establishments in the United States
Magazines established in 1996
Visual arts magazines published in the United States